Mabrya flaviflora is a mat-forming herbaceous perennial native to a small area in Baja California Norte, Mexico. It has pale yellow tubular flowers. It was first described by Ivan M. Johnston in 1924 in the genus Maurandya and transferred to Mabrya by Wayne J. Elisens in 1985 as Mabrya geniculata subsp. flaviflora. It was restored to a full species within Mabrya by David A. Sutton in 1988. The epithet flaviflora means yellow-flowered.

References

flaviflora
Plants described in 1924